Thanyia Moore (born 20 December 1982) is an English stand-up comedian and actress.

Early life
Moore grew up in South London to Jamaican immigrant parents.

Career
Moore began performing in 2012. In 2013 she was named Best Female Newcomer at the (UK) Black Comedy Awards. In 2018 she won the Funny Women contest. She has appeared on Mock the Week.

As an actress, Moore had a supporting role on the children's TV series Jamie Johnson and also appeared in Pure and The Duchess.

Moore also gives workshops at the Bernie Grant Arts Centre.

Due to the COVID-19 pandemic she, like many other comedians, did not make her debut at the Edinburgh Fringe until August 2022.

References

External links

Black British women comedians
Living people
English people of Jamaican descent
1982 births
Comedians from London
Black British actresses
English stand-up comedians
21st-century English comedians
21st-century English actresses